Pine Valley, Utah may refer to three places in Utah:

Pine Valley, Washington County, Utah, an unincorporated community
Pine Valley (Provo River), a valley along the North Fork of the Provo River
Pine Valley (Beaver, Millard, Iron counties, Utah), a valley in southwestern Utah

See also
Pine Valley (disambiguation)